Reinstein is a surname. Notable people with the surname include:

Dan Reinstein, ophthalmic surgeon and specialist ophthalmologist in the US, Canada and the UK
Josh Reinstein, the Director of the Knesset Christian Allies Caucus and President of the Israel Allies Foundation
Julia Boyer Reinstein (1906–1998), teacher and historian who grew up in western New York
Kathi-Anne Reinstein, former American state legislator in the Massachusetts House of Representatives
Linda Reinstein (born 1955), co-founder of the Asbestos Disease Awareness Organization (ADAO)
Michael Reinstein, American businessman, lawyer, private equity executive and founder and Chairman of Regent, L.P.
William Reinstein, American politician, member of the Massachusetts House of Representatives and Mayor of Revere, Massachusetts

See also
Reinstein Woods Nature Preserve, located near the city of Buffalo in the Town of Cheektowaga in Erie County, New York, USA
Reichenstein (disambiguation)
Reifenstein (disambiguation)
Reiffenstein
Reitzenstein